Boys Life was an American indie rock band from Kansas City, Missouri, formed in 1993. The band was foundational in the emo genre, especially influencing Taking Back Sunday.

Band members went on to form other bands such as Canyon and Lullaby for the Working Class. Brandon Butler has also released several albums of solo material under his own name and formed the band Six Bells in 2014, who released their debut album in late 2015. In 2015, the band announced a brief reunion tour to coincide with the vinyl-only reissue of its second full-length album.

Members
Brandon Butler (vocals/guitar)
Joe Winkle (guitar)
John Rejba (bass)
John Anderson (drums)

Discography
Albums
Boys Life (1995, Crank! Records 004)
Departures and Landfalls (1996, Headhunter Records 063/Cargo Records; 2015 reissue, Topshelf Records 130)

Singles and splits
"Lister/Without Doubt" (7-inch single, Synergy Records)
Boys Life/Secular Theme (split 7-inch with Secular Theme, Flapjack Records)
"Breaker Breaker + 1" (7-inch single, Synergy Records)
Boys Life/Giants Chair (split 7-inch with Giants Chair, 1993, Hit It! Recordings)
Boys Life/Vitreous Humor (split 7-inch with Vitreous Humor, 1994, Crank! Records 002)
Boys Life/Christie Front Drive (split 10-inch EP with Christie Front Drive, 1996, Crank! Records 005)

Compilation appearances
(don't forget to) breathe CD / 12-inch plus 10-inch double LP (1997, Crank! Records 011)
Track 15 - "Sight Unseen" (live)

Related bands
Six Bells - Brandon Butler
Brandon Butler - Brandon Butler
Canyon - Brandon Butler, Joe Winkle
The Farewell Bend - Brandon Butler, John Rejba
Lullaby for the Working Class - John Anderson
Matt Suggs - John Anderson

References

External links

Musical groups from Kansas City, Missouri
Musical groups established in 1993
Musical groups disestablished in 1997
Musical groups reestablished in 2015
1993 establishments in Missouri
Topshelf Records artists